Dione may refer to:

Astronomy
106 Dione, a large main belt asteroid
Dione (moon), a moon of Saturn
Helene (moon), a moon of Saturn sometimes referred to as "Dione B"

Mythology
Dione (Titaness), a Titaness in Greek mythology
Dione (mythology), a name for various women in Greek mythology

Biology
 Dione (alga), a genus of red algae in the family Bangiaceae
 Dione (butterfly), a genus in the family Heliconiinae
 Pitar dione, the elegant venus clam

Boating
Dione 98, a Spanish sailboat design

Chemistry
Diketone (Dione), a molecule containing two ketone groups
Ethylene dione (ethylenedione, ethene dione, or ethene 1,2-dione), a hypothetical chemical compound with the formula C2O2 (O=C=C=O)

Given name
Dione Lucas (1909–1971), English chef and first female graduate of Le Cordon Bleu
Dee Dee Sharp (born Dione LaRue, 1945), American R&B singer
Dione Santos (born 1979), Brazilian footballer
Dione Taylor, Canadian jazz singer

Literature
 Dione (play), a 1720 work by the British writer John Gay

Popular culture
Dee Bliss (Dione "Dee" Rebecchi), from the Australian soap opera Neighbours
Thanos, a villain in Marvel Comics, was originally given the name by his mother

Surname
Dione (Serer surname), a West African surname among the Serer people with no connection to the French "Dione"
Rose Dione (1875–1936), French actress
Aura Dione, Danish singer-songwriter

Other
Dione plc, a former UK-based point-of-sale equipment manufacturer, now part of VeriFone

See also
Deon, given name
Deion, given name
Dion (disambiguation)
Dionne (disambiguation)
Diode